The name "Nosferatu" has been presented as an archaic Romanian word, synonymous with "vampire".  However, it was largely popularized in the late 19th and early 20th centuries by Western fiction such as Dracula (1897), and the film Nosferatu (1922).  One of the suggested etymologies of the term is that it is derived from the Romanian Nesuferit ("offensive" or "troublesome").

Origins of the word
The etymology of the word nosferatu is undetermined. There is no doubt that it achieved currency through Bram Stoker's 1897 novel Dracula and its unauthorised cinematic adaptation, Nosferatu (1922). Stoker identified his source for the term as 19th-century British author and speaker Emily Gerard. It is commonly thought that Gerard introduced the word into print in an 1885 magazine article, "Transylvanian Superstitions", and in her travelogue The Land Beyond the Forest ("Transylvania" is Latin for "beyond the forest", literally "across/through the forest"). She merely refers to "Nosferatu" as the Romanian word for vampire: 

More decidedly evil, however, is the vampire, or nosferatu, in which every Romanian peasant believes as firmly as he does in heaven or hell. There are two sorts of vampires-—living and dead. The living vampire is in general the illegitimate offspring of two illegitimate persons, but even a flawless pedigree will not ensure anyone against the intrusion of a vampire into his family vault, since every person killed by a nosferatu becomes likewise a vampire after death, and will continue to suck the blood of other innocent people till the spirit has been exorcised, either by opening the grave of the person suspected and driving a stake through the corpse, or firing a pistol shot into the coffin. In very obstinate cases it is further recommended to cut off the head and replace it in the coffin with the mouth filled with garlic, or to extract the heart and burn it, strewing the ashes over the grave.

However, the word had already appeared in an 1865 German-language article by Wilhelm Schmidt. Schmidt's article discusses Transylvanian customs and appeared in an Austro-Hungarian magazine, which Gerard could have encountered as a reviewer of German literature living in Austria-Hungary. Schmidt's article also mentions the legendary Scholomance by name, which parallels Gerard's "Transylvanian Superstitions". Schmidt does not identify the language explicitly, but he puts the word nosferatu in a typeface which indicates it to be a language other than German.

Schmidt's description is unambiguous in identifying nosferatu as a "Vampyr. 

At this point, I come to the vampire – nosferatu. It is this, the illegitimate offspring of two illegitimately begotten people or the unfortunate spirit of one killed by a vampire, who can appear in the form of dog, cat, toad, frog, louse, flea, bug, in any form, in short, and plays his evil tricks on newly engaged couples as incubus or succubus – zburatorul – by name, just like the Old Slavonic or Bohemian Blkodlak, Vukodlak or Polish Mora and Russian Kikimora. That which was believed about this and used as a defense more than 100 years ago is still true today, and there can hardly dare to be a village which would not be in a position to present a personal experience or at least hearsay with firm conviction of the veracity.

Schmidt expanded on his 1865 article in an 1866 monograph, adding the observation that the vampire was the "uncanniest spawn of national-slavic fantasy" and that his description was the Romanian perception.

However, nosferatu in that form does not appear to be a standard word in any known historical phase of Romanian (aside from that introduced by the novel and the films). Internal evidence in Dracula suggests that Stoker believed the term meant "not dead" in Romanian, and thus he may have intended the word undead to be its calque.

Peter Haining identifies an earlier source for nosferatu as Roumanian Superstitions (1861) by Heinrich von Wlislocki. However, Wlislocki seems only to have written in German, and according to the Magyar Néprajzi Lexikon, Wlislocki was born in 1856 (d. 1907), which makes his authorship of an English-titled 1861 source doubtful. Certain details of Haining's citation also conflict with David J. Skal, so this citation seems unreliable. Skal identifies a similar reference to the word "nosferat" in an article by Wlislocki dating from 1896. Since this postdates Gerard and has a number of parallels to Gerard's work, Skal considers it likely that Wlislocki is derivative from Gerard. There is also evidence to suggest that Haining derived his citation for Roumanian Superstitions from a confused reading of an extract in Ernest Jones's book, On the Nightmare (1931).

Wlislocki's later description of "der Nosferat" is more extensive than either Schmidt's or Gerard's. The former two German-language sources particularly emphasize the dual role of the creature as both blood-drinker and incubus/succubus. Wlislocki's nosferat is said to drink the blood of older people, while seeking to have sexual intercourse with young people and especially newlyweds, often being blamed for illegitimate children (who become moroi), impotence, and infertility. From the description by Wlislocki, who was a half-Saxon native of Kronstadt (Hungarian Brassó, Romanian Brașov, one of Saxon Transylvania's "seven cities"), it is difficult not to get the impression that both the term and the idea must have been quite well known in his community, which makes the inability to confirm its existence in Romanian literature rather puzzling.

One proposed etymology of nosferatu is that the term originally came from the Greek nosophoros (νοσοφόρος), meaning "disease-bearing". F. W. Murnau's film Nosferatu (1922) strongly emphasizes this theme of disease, and Murnau's creative direction in the film may have been influenced by this etymology (or vice versa). There are several difficulties with this etymology. Schmidt, Gerard, and Wlislocki, all three sometime residents of Transylvania, identified the word as Romanian, and even proponents of the "nosophoros" etymology (as well as most other commentators) seem to have little doubt that this is correct; Wlislocki particularly was regarded as an expert in Transylvanian languages and folklore and was a prolific author on the subjects. Curiously, in Wlislocki's 1896 article, he presents a parenthetical analysis of the related Romanian term solomonar but has nothing to say regarding the origin and connections of the term nosferat, despite having normalized the spelling of both relative to Schmidt's earlier account. If this Romanian identification is taken to be correct, the first objection to the "nosophoros" etymology is that Romanian is a Romance language. While Romanian does have some words borrowed from Greek, as do most European languages, Greek is generally considered to be only a minor contributor to the Romanian vocabulary—absent any other information, any given Romanian word is much more likely to be of Latin origin than Greek. Second, the word appears to be quite rare in Greek. One instance of a Greek word similar to νοσοφόρος, νοσηφόρος ("nosēphoros"), is attested in fragments from a 2nd-century AD work by Marcellus Sidetes on medicine plus another of the Ionic dialect variant νουσοφόρος ("nousophoros") from the Palatine Anthology. These two variant forms are subsumed as examples of the main νοσοφόρος lemma in the definitive Liddel-Scott Greek–English Lexicon, but examples of the normalized form itself seem to be lacking. In any event, supporting evidence for a relationship between this rare and obscure Greek term and nosferatu appears weak.

In some versions of the "nosophoros" etymology, an intermediate form *nesufur-atu, or sometimes *nosufur-atu is presented but both the original source for this and the justification for it are unclear. This form is often indicated to be Slavonic or Slavic. It is likely that either Old Church Slavonic or the protolanguage Proto-Slavic is intended. As with νοσοφόρος, this supposed Slavonic word does not appear to be attested in primary sources, which severely undermines the credibility of the argument.

Another common etymology suggests that the word meant "not breathing", which appears to be attempting to read a derivative of the Latin verb spirare ("to breathe") as a second morpheme in nosferatu, with the closest hypothetical Romanian word being *nuspirândul. Skal notes that this is "without basis in lexicography", viewing all these etymologies (including the widely repeated nosophoros etymology) with skepticism.

A final possibility is that the form given by Gerard and the German folklorists is a well-known Romanian term without the benefit of normalized spelling, or possibly a misinterpretation of the sounds of the word due to Gerard's limited familiarity with the language, or possibly a dialectal variant of the word. The standardization of Romanian was rather incomplete in the 19th century, as can be seen in Dictionariulu Limbei Romane of 1871, which in a highly Latinized orthography defines incubu ("incubus") as "unu spiritu necuratu" compared to the modern standard "un spirit necurat". Three candidate words that have been put forth are necurat ("unclean", usually associated with the occult, compare a avea un spirit necurat, to have an evil spirit, be possessed), nesuferit, and nefârtat ("enemy", lit. "unbrothered"). The nominative masculine definite form of a Romanian noun in the declension to which these words belong takes the ending "-ul" or even the shortened "u", as in Romanian "l" is usually lost in the process of speaking, so the definite forms nefârtatu, necuratu and nesuferitu are commonly encountered.

References

Citations

General bibliography 

 (As a native Romanian, Dr. Buican's opinion that nosferatu is a mishearing of necuratu carries particular weight.)

	

	
 ("Hungarian Ethnographic Lexicon")

 
 (Skal reprints a large quotation of the relevant Wlislocki material)

 (The information relating to the "Nosferatu" from the article written by Mrs. Gerard in 1885 is reprinted on pp. 21–22).

Further reading 
 Peter M. Kreuter, Vampirglaube in Südosteuropa. Berlin, 2001.

Nosferatu
Romanian words and phrases
Undead